Aayush Sharma (born 26 October 1990) is an Indian actor who works in Hindi films. He made his film debut with brother-in-law Salman Khan's production Loveyatri (2018). His film Antim: The Final Truth (2021) was critically and commercially acclaimed, in which he starred alongside Khan.

Early life
Aayush Sharma was born on 26 October 1990 in Mandi, Himachal Pradesh to Anil and Sunita Sharma. He has a sibling, Aashray Sharma. He is the grandson of veteran congress leader Pandit Sukh Ram, ex-cabinet minister, who comes from village Kotli in district Mandi. Sharma's family has been involved in politics for more than 50 years and have a very special place in Himachal politics.

Career
In 2018, Sharma debuted in Bollywood with the lead role in Salman Khan's production Loveyatri opposite newcomer Warina Hussain. In 2020, he and Saiee Manjrekar were seen in the music video Manjha by Vishal Mishra. His breakthrough came in 2021 when he portrayed a gangster alongside Khan in his another production Antim.

He is next set to appear in the actioner Kwatha with Isabelle Kaif, a film delayed since 2019. In May 2022, he confirmed that he will reunite with Khan in his production Kabhi Eid Kabhi Diwali, in which he is playing his brother.

Personal life
Sharma married  Arpita Khan, the younger adoptive sister of Salman Khan on 18 November 2014. They have a son, Ahil (born 30 March 2016), and a daughter, Ayat (born 27 December 2019).

Filmography

Films

Music videos

Awards and nominations

See also 

 List of Bollywood actors

References 

1990 births
Living people
Indian male film actors
Indian male models
21st-century Indian male actors